Doris parrae is a species of sea slug (nudibranch), a marine gastropod mollusc in the family Dorididae. It is named after Chilean musician Violeta Parra.

Distribution
This species was described from the Galapagos Islands.

References

Dorididae
Gastropods described in 2017